Trailing iceplant or trailing ice plant may refer to the following plant species:

Delosperma cooperi
Lampranthus aurantiacus
Lampranthus aureus
Lampranthus spectabilis
Lampranthus zeyheri